The Philippines participated at the 12th Southeast Asian Games held in Singapore from May 28 - June 6, 1983.

SEA Games performance
The country finished second overall behind Indonesia. It was a feat surpassed all expectations and a cause for national celebration. No less than President Marcos personally congratulated the athletes at Malacanang as he expressed the sentiments of the entire Filipino nation for a job well done.

It was in two sports, athletics and boxing, which the Philippines stampled their class in the Singapore SEAG that gave other competing nations a view of the Philippines' resurgence in sports. The Filipinos emerged as the overall champions in track and field. In Boxing, Efren Tabanas (flyweight), Raymundo Suico (light-middleweight), Leopoldo Cantancio (featherweight) and Nelson Jamili (pinweight) gave the country a four gold medals. Swimming came next behind athletics with the most number of medals produced with 10, four of them from American trained swimming marvel Billy Wilson. Christine Jacob accounted for two more, while the ageless Jairulla Jaitulla romped away with two golds to underscore the Filipino tankers' fruitful bid.

Weightlifting was highlighted by a sweep of Jaime Sebastian in the super-super heavyweight division as he confirmed his reputation as the strongest man in Southeast Asia. The Philippine men's basketball team, mentored by Larry Albano, swept the tournament, including a 72-66 victory over arch rival Malaysia, to retain the championship. Their female counterparts finished second anew to defending title holder Malaysia.

In some of the country's stinging setbacks, the most humiliating was the defeat of Lydia de Vega, Asia's sprint queen, to Thailand's Wallapa Pinij in the 100 meters. De Vega, however, returned to win her next duel with Pinij in the 200 meter event.  Another heartbreaker was the defeat of the defending champion women's volleyball team at the hands of a well-prepared Indonesian sextet. Badminton, Sepak Takraw and Table Tennis went home empty-handed.

Medalists

Gold

Silver

Bronze

Multiple

Medal summary

By sports

References

External links
http://www.olympic.ph

Southeast Asian Games
Nations at the 1983 Southeast Asian Games
1983